Algona College was a private Methodist college in Algona, Iowa. It was open between 1869 and 1875.

History
The college was associated with the Methodist Episcopal Church. Its president from 1871 to 1875 was the classicist Orlando Harrison Baker.

Iowa historian Harvey Ingham wrote a history of the college in 1925 and reported that the college closed due to financial difficulties resulting from a plague of locusts. Apparently families in the region could not continue to support the college when their crops were insufficient to support their own families. Ingham wrote that the Upper Des Moines newspaper reported on March 10, 1875, that Congress had appropriated $150,000 for the purchase of seed grain for farmers in the devastated regions of Kansas, Nebraska, Iowa, and Minnesota. Ingham concluded that “it is easy to see that soliciting for college endowments was not an encouraging prospect in the grasshopper years."

A contributing factor was community discord over the licening of saloons in the previously "dry" county.

Ingham wrote that in December, 1872 the college newspaper, the "Algona Collegian" reported the following tuition:

Common English -- $6.00 
Higher English, Latin and Greek -- $8.00
French or German -- (no price listed)
Incidental Fee -- $1.00
Instrumental Music -- $10.00
Use of Instrument for Practice -- $2.00

Board (lodging) was available with families in the community for $2.00 to $3.00 per week.

See also
 List of colleges and universities in Iowa

References

Education in Kossuth County, Iowa
Defunct private universities and colleges in Iowa
Educational institutions established in 1869
1875 disestablishments in Iowa
1869 establishments in Iowa